Lost Angeles may refer to:
 "Lost Angeles", song by Colosseum that appeared on their albums The Grass Is Greener (1970) and Colosseum Live (1971)
 "Lost Angeles", song by Giorgio Moroder from his album From Here to Eternity (1977)
 Lost Angeles, film directed by Phedon Papamichael (2012)
 Lost Angeles, EP by Lost Kings (2019)

See also 
 Los Angeles